Acraman may refer to:

Places
Acraman crater, an impact crater in South Australia
Lake Acraman, a lake at the centre of the Acraman crater
Acraman Creek, a stream in the west of South Australia
Acraman Creek Conservation Park, a protected area in the west of South Australia

People with the surname
John Acraman (1829–1907), 
Rodney Acraman, Fiji Islander